The Nanobusiness Commercialization Association (NanoBCA) is a 501(c)(6) non-profit trade organization dedicated to creating a friendly political environment that nurtures research and innovation in nanotechnology, promotes tech-transfer of nanotechnologies from academia to industry, encourages private capital investments in nanotechnology companies, and helps its company members bringing nanotechnology products to the market. Founded in 2001, NanoBCA is the world's first nonprofit association focused on the commercialization of nanotechnologies. Since its establishment, NanoBCA has been advocating for the continued allocation of significant funds per the National Nanotechnology Initiative (NNI). NanoBCA dedicated work in shaping national nanotechnology policy has created a favorable policy climate for nanotechnology at every level, benefiting academic research, small businesses, and the manufacturing industry. NanoBCA has been advocating Congress to ensure the continuous allocation of government funds to nanotechnology, such as basic research and SBIR grants, throughout all the major government agencies (DOD, DOE, NFS, NIH, etc.).

Based in Washington, D.C., and Shelton, Connecticut, the NanoBCA serves the entirety of United States and its territories. Their vision is focused on ensuring that the United States is and remains a global leader in the field of nanotechnology. By monitoring newly passed and proposed legislation from the Federal and State governments, NanoBCA assure the safe, secure, and beneficial used of nanotechnology and nanoscience for all peoples.

History 

In November 2001, NanoBCA was founded  by F. Mark Modzelewski, Nathan Tinker, Josh Wolfe, Vincent Caprio, and Griffith Kundahl – with the intention of boosting the advancements of nanotechnology from basic research to commercial products. 
Since 2001, the organization has been directed and managed by Mr. Vincent Caprio who takes care of moderating productive discussion among its members, the Government, Congress, academia, and industry, as well as organizing the annual conferences and roundtables. 
In March 2011, the organization changed its name from NanoBusiness Alliance to NanoBusiness Commercialization Association to display its dedication to the commercialization of nanotechnology products.

External links 

NanoBCA official website: www.nanobca.org

References 
Note: References published in or before 2011 might refer to the organization with its former name of NanoBusiness Alliance.

Organizations established in 2001
Non-profit organizations based in the United States
501(c)(6) nonprofit organizations